Karel Maydl (10 March 1853 – 8 August 1903) was an Austrian surgeon who was a native of Rokytnice nad Jizerou, Bohemia.

In 1876 he received his medical doctorate at Prague, and following graduation was a surgical assistant to Carl Wilhelm Heine (1838–1877). Afterwards he worked with Eduard Albert (1841–1900) at the Universities of Innsbruck and Vienna. In 1886, he became an associate professor in Vienna, and in 1891 was appointed professor of surgery at the Czech University in Prague.

Karel Maydl is remembered for the introduction of new surgical techniques, including a procedure for treatment of bladder exstrophy, as well as loop colostomy for use in cases of inoperable rectal cancer.

His name is associated with "Maydl's hernia", defined as a strangulated bowel within the abdominal cavity having the loops of the intestines forming a W.

In 1897 he was the first physician to describe the disease later known as Legg–Calvé–Perthes syndrome.

References 

 

1853 births
1903 deaths
People from Rokytnice nad Jizerou
Austro-Hungarian surgeons